Calaveras de Abajo is a locality located in the municipality of Almanza, in León province, Castile and León, Spain. As of 2020, it has a population of 20.

Geography 
Calaveras de Abajo is located 65km east-northeast of León, Spain.

References

Populated places in the Province of León